is Japanese pink film. This erotic film was directed by Ryū Murakami (村上 龍 Murakami Ryū) with music by Ryuichi Sakamoto (坂本 龍一 Sakamoto Ryūichi). The film was shot and completed during 1991 and released in the start of 1992. It stars Miho Nikaido (二階堂 美穂 Nikaidō Miho) and is known by two alternate titles, Topaz and Sex Dreams of Topaz.. Because of the cruel and graphic nature of this film, it has been banned in several countries such as Australia and South Korea. Shimada Masahiko (島田 雅彦 Shimada Masahiko) also makes an appearance in this film. The story follows , the submissive and lovesick prostitute who goes about her trade with misery and is being abused by hedonists and criminals while trying to find some sort of appeasement away from the fact that her lover is currently married.

Plot
Ai, a timid 22-year-old college student in Tokyo, works as a prostitute for an exclusive escort agency that caters to wealthy, perverted men. To please her clients, Ai has to play out elaborate fantasy scenarios involving sexual humiliation and light sadomasochism/bondage.

The first two-thirds of the film consists in large part of four erotic sequences involving sodomy, sadomasochism, submission and bondage. Including dildos and mirrors—one with a perverted male dominant, one with a promiscuous female dominant. The other two involve erotic asphyxiation with, again, one episode in which a necrophiliac attempts to partially asphyxiate the female protagonist and the other in which a drug addicted man is the recipient to the female protagonist. Other acts of fetishes and paraphilias are involved in some of the scenarios.

The last third of the film consists of Ai's attempt to find her ex-lover, a famous Gallery artist.

The actual story however, revolves around Ai's attempt to place herself in the world and understand her life in an attempt to make her own way forward.

This is played out through the juxtaposition of the false closeness of the paid relationships with her decadent clients against her unrequited love for the gallery artist who has ended his relationship with her. The viewer can see that Ai is desperately grasping at this relationship as real in contrast to the simulated fetish relationships of her clients and we learn that she wishes to tell him of her continued love even though he has moved on and been married.

Ai shows an emotional connection to one of her clients, another sex worker who is a female dominant and who Ai clearly admires. Throughout the movie this person is the only person with whom Ai has a free open conversation. This woman delivers a monologue which defines her view of the sex trade as empowering and which is a sentinel defining concept to place the movie itself in a social context. This speech comes at a time when Ai appears to be having difficulties accepting her role as an escort and Ai is shown listening with rapt attention.

Ai confides to this client that she has unrequited love for the gallery artist and Ai's client tells her that she must live life to the fullest otherwise she will be filled with regrets. She tells Ai that she must confront this part of her life then she can move forward as her future will be hers.

At the beginning of the movie we are introduced to Ai's quest to find herself and her direction, She visits a fortune-teller, played by artist Yayoi Kusama, who advises her to find a "pink stone", and then 
fashion it into a ring.

The fortune teller also advises Ai to put a telephone directory under her television and to avoid a gallery in the east. Ai's view of the ring is important enough that when she later loses the ring she risks her life to recover it.

Throughout the movie Ai looks at a photo of what appears to be her as a child with her mother and which in context represents innocence before life became complicated. Ai appears to refer to it to ground herself perhaps pondering how the happy child has transformed in to what she has become.

Taking the advice of her female client, and an unidentified drug which her client gave her to provide her with the courage of lions, she becomes dangerously inebriated and fails in an attempt to meet her ex lover,

She is rescued from the police by one of the artist's neighbors who is said to have once been a great singer but is now crazy. This woman met Ai only a few minutes earlier and told her that she used to be friends with the Gallery artist but it is over and that she considers Ai to be her "best friend".

Ai who is now sitting dirty and battered, looks at the photo of herself and her mother and destroys it signifying her move away from innocence and her past. In the next scene now clean, she studies the pink stone on her hand and has the faintest trace of a smile twitch across the corner of her mouth. She pulls her hair back as she looks at herself in the mirror and goes off to her usual routine which is also now her new life, externally the same as her old life but internally different as she has taken control, found herself with the future now belonging to her.

Throughout the film, Ai's movements have been timid and stiff and her posture demure. After the credits there is a sequence of her dancing on stage boldly and fluidly thus finalizing her growth in to her new future.

There are at least two versions of Tokyo Decadence, with the shorter one edited more for pacing than for censorship.

See also 
Sadism and masochism in fiction
Ai No Shinsekai
New Tokyo Decadence – The Slave

References

External links
 

1991 films
1990s pornographic films
BDSM in films
Censored films
Films directed by Ryū Murakami
Pink films
1990s Japanese films